John Alexander Logan Jr., born Manning Alexander Logan (July 24, 1865 – November 11, 1899), was a United States Army officer who posthumously received the Medal of Honor for actions during the Philippine–American War.

Biography
Logan was the son of Major General, statesman and politician John A. Logan and the writer, editor Mary Simmerson Cunningham Logan. He was a former cadet at West Point as a member of the class of 1887.

Upon his father's death in 1886, Logan became a First Class Companion of the Military Order of the Loyal Legion of the United States (MOLLUS), a military society of officers of the Union armed forces and their descendants. In 1894 he became a member of the Ohio Society of the Sons of the American Revolution. In 1897, he became a Hereditary Companion of the District of Columbia Commandery of the Military Order of Foreign Wars (MOFW) by right of his father's service in the Mexican War. He was assigned (MOFW) insignia number 284.

During the Spanish–American War he was commissioned as a major in the United States Volunteers and served as an assistant adjutant general in the Siege of Santiago.

Major Logan participated in the Philippine–American War as a battalion commander in the 33d United States Volunteer Infantry. He was mortally wounded while leading his troops in an attack on a much larger force in the Battle of San Jacinto (1899).   On May 3, 1902 he was posthumously awarded the Medal of Honor for this action.  He is buried in Oak Hill Cemetery in Youngstown, Ohio.

Medal of Honor citation
Rank and Organization: Major, 33d Infantry, U.S. Volunteers. Place and Date: At San Jacinto, Philippine Islands, November 11, 1899. Entered Service At: Youngstown, Ohio. Born: July 24, 1865, Carbondale, Ill. Date of Issue: May 3, 1902.

Citation:

For most distinguished gallantry in leading his battalion upon the entrenchments of the enemy, on which occasion he fell mortally wounded.

See also

 List of Medal of Honor recipients

Notes

References
  
 
 

1865 births
1899 deaths
United States Army officers
United States Army Medal of Honor recipients
American military personnel killed in the Philippine–American War
American military personnel of the Philippine–American War
People from Carbondale, Illinois
Philippine–American War recipients of the Medal of Honor
Military personnel from Illinois
Sons of the American Revolution